is a Japanese romantic comedy josei manga series written and illustrated by . Published by Shueisha, the chapters of the manga were serialized on You between February 15, 2013, and March 15, 2017, and have been compiled into six tankōbon volume. It was preceded by a one-shot published in the same magazine in December 2012, and followed by two side stories in April 2017 and December 2017. A live-action film adaptation of the same name was released in Japan on June 4, 2016.

Characters
Kie Hirano
Mitsumasa Kōdai

Volumes

Reception
Volumes 3 reached the ninth place on the Oricon weekly manga charts and, as of February 8, 2015, had sold 120,783 copies. Volume 4 also reached the ninth place on the charts and, as of October 11, 2015, had sold 157,073 copies. Volume 6 charted at the third position and, as of June 4, 2017, had sold 202,215.

The first two volumes placed 44th on the 15th Book of the Year list of comics by Da Vinci magazine and the first four volumes placed 23rd the following year. It was 11th placed in Zenkoku Shotenin ga Eranda Osusume Comic 2015, a ranking of the top 15 manga recommended by Japanese bookstores. It was a candidate in the Manga category at the 2016 Sugoi Japan Awards held by Yomiuri Shimbun. It was number twelve on the 2016 Kono Manga ga Sugoi! Top 20 Manga for Female Readers survey.

Film adaptation

A live-action film adaptation is scheduled for release in Japan on June 4, 2016.

See also
Gokusen, another manga series by the same author

References

External links
 

2012 manga
Josei manga
Manga adapted into films
One-shot manga
Romantic comedy anime and manga
Shueisha franchises
Shueisha manga
Fiction about telepathy